Table View Primary School (Afrikaans: Laerskool Table View) is a parallel medium school located in Table View, a west coast suburb of Cape Town in the Western Cape province of South Africa. The school has about 1,800 learners and 80 teachers. There is a strong emphasis on sports, culture and academics.

Sports
The different summer sport activities offered to learners are cricket, swimming, tennis, and athletics. Winter sports consist of rugby, hockey, netball, cross country, and biathlon. Learners also take part in chess and table tennis. 

The school houses—Rietvlei, Blouberg, and Atlanta—participate in an annual inter-house athletics competition in November. The top athletes go through to District North Athletics Championships, where they are selected for the Western Province Championships.

Culture
Classes for music, art, and drama are offered. Art activities can be further developed after school if learners join the Art Club. There are two choirs, a Junior Choir and a Senior Choir. TVPS achieves great success at the Tygerberg International Eisteddfod. Learners take part in prepared and unprepared reading, poetry and art.

Curriculum
Table View Primary's curriculum is laid down by the Western Cape Education Department. All the teachers from Grade R to 7 are trained for Curriculum Assessment Policy Statements (CAPS).

Subjects

 Afrikaans Home Language or First Additional Language
 English Home Language or First Additional Language
 Mathematics
 Natural Sciences and Technology
 Social Sciences
Economic and Managements Sciences
 Life Skills
 Physical Education
 Creative Arts
 Personal and Social Well-being

References

Schools in the Western Cape